is a passenger railway station located in the city of Tatsuno, Hyōgo Prefecture, Japan, operated by West Japan Railway Company (JR West).

Lines

Station layout
The station consists of one ground-level side platform serving  single bi-directional track. The station is unattended.

History
Senbon Station opened on March 24, 1934.  With the privatization of the Japan National Railways (JNR) on April 1, 1987, the station came under the aegis of the West Japan Railway Company.

Passenger statistics
In fiscal 2019, the station was used by an average of 31 passengers daily.

Surrounding area
 JA Hyogo Nishi Senbon Branch

See also
List of railway stations in Japan

References

External links

 Station Official Site

Railway stations in Hyōgo Prefecture
Kishin Line
Railway stations in Japan opened in 1934
Tatsuno, Hyōgo